Bob's Discount Furniture is an American furniture store chain headquartered in Manchester, Connecticut. The company opened its first store in 1991 in Newington, Connecticut and is ranked 12th in sales among United States furniture stores according to Furniture Today's list of Top 100 Furniture Stores. , the company has 150 stores in 24 US states, primarily in the Northeast, Mid-Atlantic, Midwest, and West Coast regions.

History 

After the future company's co-founder, Bob Kaufman, was injured in a  1976 motorcycle accident, he discovered the benefits of a waterbed for recuperation. This led him to become involved in waterbed sales and, during the 1980s, he rented space in 24 New England stores to sell them. When waterbed sales dwindled by 1990, Kaufman partnered with Gene Rosenberg who owned Wholesale Furniture, one of the stores where Kaufman had rented space.

Together Kaufman and Rosenberg co-founded Bob's Discount Furniture with Rosenberg owning two-thirds of the company and Kaufman one-third. Rosenberg acquired a building in Newington, Connecticut, previously owned by a furniture company which had gone bankrupt, and re-opened it in 1991 as the first Bob's Discount Furniture store.

Through the 1990s, the company added additional locations, often acquiring buildings that had been vacated by tenants bankrupted during the early 1990s US recession. By 1997, it had a dozen stores in Connecticut and two in western Massachusetts. Its ability to grow during its early years in spite of unfavorable economic conditions has been partially attributed to the extensive use of commercials.

In early 2005, the investment firm Saunders Karp & Megrue acquired 70 percent ownership of Bob's Discount Furniture. Subsequently, Saunders Karp & Megrue was acquired by Apax Partners Worldwide in March 2005. In November 2006, Ted English, former president and CEO of TJX Companies, became the CEO of Bob's Discount Furniture, replacing Stan Adelstein, who became chairman. Adelstein retired in April 2013, and English took over as chairman. In late 2006, the company expanded into Rhode Island, New Jersey, and New York followed by an expansion further south into Maryland and Virginia.

In Q1 of 2014, Bob's Discount Furniture was acquired by Bain Capital, though its current management team continued to own a significant stake in the company. In 2016, Michael Skirvin was promoted from president and COO to president and CEO, replacing English who remained with the company as executive chairman. In June 2020, Skirvin retired and English became interim CEO. In October the position was permanently filled by William Barton, formerly of California Closets.

Advertising 
Bob's Discount Furniture is a prolific advertiser on both television and radio.  In 1997, the company was broadcasting roughly 500 commercials a week in Connecticut on network and cable television stations. By 2006, the commercials had become common during broadcasts of Boston Red Sox and New York Mets games. The commercials usually feature company president Bob Kaufman, typically wearing jeans and a golf shirt or turtleneck, and have also included employees such as Cathy Poulin, the company's Director of Public Relations. Starting in 2004, “Little Bob”, a miniature version of Bob Kaufman, frequently appeared in the company’s commercials. The advertisements have been frequently described as wacky and goofy often containing catch phrases describing their “untouchable value”.

Through corporate sponsorship programs, Bob’s Discount Furniture has worked with several professional sports teams, including the New England Patriots, Pittsburgh Steelers, New York Giants, Los Angeles Chargers, and Los Angeles Galaxy.

Stores 

, Bob’s Discount Furniture has 150 locations in 24 US states. The majority of these are in the Northeast, Mid-Atlantic, Midwest, and West Coast regions.

After its original markets in the Northeast and Mid-Atlantic, its Midwest expansion came in the wake of H.H. Gregg's sudden liquidation, allowing Bob's to purchase the leases for the bankrupt retailer's former locations. The company expanded to the West Coast in February 2018, picking up leases of former Sport Chalet and Sports Authority stores that closed in 2016. Around July 2020, Bob's expanded to the Phoenix metropolitan area in Arizona.

Bob’s Discount Furniture locations include an in-store cafe with complimentary refreshments. Some stores also have a back room with products that are considered imperfect; this area is called “The Outlet”.

Community involvement 

Bob's Discount Furniture donates over $2.75 million per year to charitable causes through two initiatives, the Bob’s Discount Furniture Charitable Foundation and Bob’s Outreach program. Through these efforts, the company has supported March of Dimes, Autism Speaks, Special Olympics, Save the Children, and Camp Rising Sun. It has also been recognized by the American Red Cross for its financial contributions and sponsored blood drives, some in partnership with professional American football teams including the New England Patriots and New York Giants.

Through the company’s Random Acts of Kindness program, funds are donated to local schools and programs for children following the opening of a new store. It also operated a charity fundraising event for over 30 years to raise funds for a number of non-profit charities, including Nutmeg Big Brothers Big Sisters, Family & Children’s Aid, Connecticut Children’s Medical Center, and Camp Rising Sun. The company collects and matches in-store donations from its customers through its Café Collections for a Cause program which supports non-profit charities including Autism Speaks, Alex's Lemonade Stand Foundation, and the Special Olympics.

References

External links 
 

Retail companies established in 1991
Companies based in Manchester, Connecticut
Furniture retailers of the United States
Apax Partners companies
Bain Capital companies
1991 establishments in Connecticut
Privately held companies based in Connecticut
American companies established in 1991
2014 mergers and acquisitions